Liam James Lewis (born 23 October 1986) is an English cricketer. Lewis is a right-handed batsman. He was born in Exeter, Devon.

While studying for his degree at Loughborough University, Lewis made his first-class debut for Loughborough UCCE against Somerset in 2007. He made a further first-class appearance for the team in 2007, against Worcestershire. In his two first-class matches, he scored 26 runs at an average of 6.50, with a high score of 21.

Lewis later played for Devon in the 2011 season, so far making just a single appearance in the Minor Counties Championship against Cheshire.

References

External links
Liam Lewis at ESPNcricinfo
Liam Lewis at CricketArchive

1986 births
Living people
Cricketers from Exeter
Alumni of Loughborough University
English cricketers
Loughborough MCCU cricketers
Devon cricketers